Faysal Ahmed is a Bangladeshi cricketer. He made his List A debut for Kala Bagan Krira Chakra in the 2017–18 Dhaka Premier Division Cricket League on 1 April 2018.

References

External links
 

Year of birth missing (living people)
Living people
Bangladeshi cricketers
Kala Bagan Krira Chakra cricketers
Place of birth missing (living people)